This is a list of notable people who are from British Columbia, Canada, or have spent a large part or formative part of their career in that province.

Premiers
See List of premiers of British Columbia.

Members of Parliament
 Jim Abbott
 David Anderson
 Thomas Speakman Barnett
 Dave Barrett, former Premier of British Columbia
 Ron Basford
 Don Bell
 Thomas Berger
 Hewitt Bostock
 Margaret Bridgman
 Chuck Cadman
 Iona Campagnolo, later Lieutenant-Governor of British Columbia
 Kim Campbell, also Prime Minister of Canada
 Pat Carney
 Raymond Chan
 Mary Collins
 Chuck Cook
 Jean Crowder
 Nathan Cullen
 John Cummins
 Libby Davies
 Stockwell Day
 Amor De Cosmos, second Premier of British Columbia
 Edgar Dewdney, later Lieutenant-Governor of British Columbia
 Herb Dhaliwal
 Ujjal Dosanjh, former Premier of British Columbia
 Tommy Douglas
 John Duncan
 David Emerson
 Paul Forseth
 Hedy Fry
 Jim Gouk
 Gurmant Grewal
 Nina Grewal
 Herbert Wilfred Herridge
 Russ Hiebert
 Jay Hill
 Betty Hinton
 Frank Howard
 William Irvine
 Pauline Jewett
 Peter Julian
 Douglas Jung
 Jim Karpoff
 Sophia Leung
 Gary Lunn
 Grace MacInnis
 Ian Alistair Mackenzie
 Roy MacLaren
 Len Marchand
 Keith Martin
 Gerry McGeer
 James Moore
 Henry Nathan Jr.
 Stephen Owen
 George Pearkes, later Lieutenant-Governor of British Columbia
 Art Phillips, former mayor of Vancouver
 Elmore Philpott
 John Reynolds
 Nelson Riis
 Svend Robinson
 Paul St. Pierre
 Tom Siddon
 Bill Siksay
 Bob Skelly
 Darrel Stinson
 Chuck Strahl
 John Turner, also Prime Minister of Canada
 Ian Waddell
 Mark Warawa
 Randy White

Jurists
Beverley McLachlin, chief justice of Canada
Alfred Scow, First Status Indian judge BC Provincial Court

Other politicians
 Emery Barnes
 Wesley Drewett Black, Provincial Secretary 1952-1972
 Richard Blanshard, first Governor of the Colony of Vancouver Island
 Rosemary Brown
Frank Arthur Calder, First Nations MLA and Nisga'a politician
 Sir James Douglas, colonial governor (all colonies)
 Jennifer Granholm, Canadian/American politician and former Governor of Michigan (2003-2011); naturalized US citizen
 Ginger Goodwin, Labour organizer
 Guujaaw, Haida politician, activist and cultural leader
 Edward John
 Arthur Kennedy, governor of the united colonies of Vancouver Island and British Columbia
 David Lam, philanthropist and Lieutenant-Governor
 Rafe Mair
 Grace McCarthy
 Joy McPhail
 Frederick Seymour, Governor of Vancouver Island and of British Columbia
 William Fraser Tolmie
 Joseph Trutch, colonial Lieutenant-Governor and first Lieutenant-Governor of the Province of British Columbia

Scientists
 Ian Affleck, physicist
 Robert Edward Bell, nuclear physicist
 Margaret Benston, chemist, computer scientist
 Michael Bigg, marine biologist
 Jim Chamberlin, aerodynamicist
 Wade Davis, ethnobotanist
 Ryan C.N. D'Arcy, neuroscientist
 James E. Gill, geologist
 John R. Hendricks, mathematician
 Abram Hoffer, biochemist, physician
 Frances Oldham Kelsey, pharmacologist
 Vit Klemes, hydrologist
 Mel Krajden, medical scientist
 Robert T. Lackey, fisheries scientist, ecologist, zoologist
 Robert Langlands, mathematician
 Jerrold E. Marsden, applied mathematician
 Bill Mathews, geologist, volcanologist, engineer
 Brian McConaghy, forensic scientist
 Ian McTaggart-Cowan, ecologist
 Patrick McTaggart-Cowan, meteorologist
 Faron Moller, computer scientist
 Barth Netterfield, astrophysicist
 Edward Faraday Odlum, geologist
 Santa J. Ono, biologist
 Robert Methven Petrie, astronomer
 Jerilynn Prior, medical scientist, endocrinologist
 Scott D. Sampson, paleontologist
 Martin Schechter, epidemiologist
 Robert Fletcher Shaw, engineer
 John Alexander Sinton, medical scientist, doctor, malariologist
 Frank Smith, psycholinguist
 Michael Smith, biochemist
 Wayne Smith, statistician
 David Suzuki, biologist, ecologist
 Robert Thirsk, engineer, physician, astronaut
 John Lancelot Todd, physician, parasitologist
 Bjarni Tryggvason, engineer, astronaut
 Paul Tseng, applied mathematician
 William Vickrey, Nobel Prize-winning economist
 Andrew Weaver, climate scientist
 Franklin White, public health scientist

Television/film actors and musicians
 Daniel Adair, drummer
 Bryan Adams, singer 
Evan Adams, First Nations actor (Smoke Signals)
 Pamela Anderson, actress (Baywatch, V.I.P.)
 Aaron Ashmore, actor (Warehouse 13)
 Shawn Ashmore, actor (X-Men)
 Long John Baldry, musician, songwriter
 Gil Bellows, actor
 Michael Bublé, singer
 Raymond Burr, actor (Perry Mason)
 Jim Byrnes, musician, actor (Highlander)
 Nicholas Campbell, actor (Da Vinci's Inquest)
 Chris Carter, screenwriter, producer, director (X-Files)
 Anna Cathcart, actress
 Kim Cattrall, actress (Sex and the City)
 Sarah Chalke, actress (Scrubs)
 Tommy Chong, actor, comedian, cannabis rights activist (Cheech & Chong)
 Hayden Christensen, actor (Star Wars)
 Amanda Crew, actress (Silicon Valley)
 Thomas Middleditch, actor (Silicon Valley)
 Mackenzie Davis, actress (Terminator: Dark Fate)
 William B. Davis, actor (X-Files)
 Yvonne De Carlo, actress (The Munsters)
 Mac Demarco, musician, multi-instrumentalist
 Edward Dmytryk, film director
 James Doohan, actor (Star Trek)
 Atom Egoyan, film director 
 Aryana Engineer, actress (Orphan)
 Jodelle Ferland, actress
 Noel Fisher, actor (The Twilight Saga)
 Roy Forbes (Bim), musician
 Judith Forst, opera singer
 David Foster, songwriter, record producer
 Michael J Fox, actor, producer and health activist
 Nelly Furtado, singer-songwriter
 Chief Dan George, actor (Little Big Man, Cariboo Cowboy)
 Evan Goldberg, screenwriter (Superbad, Pineapple Express)
 Matthew Good, musician
 Grimes (musician), musician
 June Havoc, actress
 Carter Hayden, actor and voice actor (Bakugan: New Vestroia, Total Drama)
 Bill Henderson (Canadian singer), musician (Chilliwack)
 Ben Heppner, opera singer
 Matt Hill, Canadian-American voice actor
 Jacob Hoggard, musician (Hedley)
 John Ireland, actor
 Robert Ito, actor
 Joshua Jackson, actor (Dawson’s Creek)
 Carly Rae Jepsen, musician
 Alexz Johnson, singer, actress
 Avan Jogia, actor
 Joe Keithley, musician, songwriter (D.O.A.)
 Allan King, film director
 Taylor Kitsch, actor and model (Friday Night Lights)
 Elias Koteas, actor (The Thin Red Line)
 Diana Krall, musician
 Kristin Kreuk, actress (Smallville)
 Nicholas Lea, actor (X-Files)
 Lights (musician), musician
 Evangeline Lilly, actress (Lost, The Hurt Locker)
 Jessica Lowndes, actress (90210)
 Jessica Lucas, actress
 Alexander Ludwig, actor (Vikings, The Hunger Games)
 Leon Mandrake, illusionist (Mandrake the Magician)
 Sarah McLachlan, musician
 Brandon Jay McLaren, actor (Power Rangers: S.P.D., She's The Man)
 Rosa Mendes, model, professional wrestler
 Shay Mitchell, actress (Pretty Little Liars)
 Carrie-Anne Moss, actress (The Matrix)
 Meghan Ory, actress
 Molly Parker, actress (House of Cards)
 Barbara Parkins, actress
 Daniel Powter, musician, singer-songwriter, and pianist
 Jason Priestley, actor
 Kirsten Prout, actress
 John Qualen, actor
 Josh Ramsay, musician (Marianas Trench)
 Mike Reno, musician, songwriter
 Ryan Reynolds, actor (Green Lantern, Deadpool)
 Donnelly Rhodes, actor (Da Vinci's Inquest)
 Emily Bett Rickards, actress
 Seth Rogen, actor, comedian, writer, producer (Pineapple Express, Superbad, Knocked Up)
Will Sasso, actor (Mad TV)
 Pablo Schreiber, actor (The Wire, Orange is the New Black)
Michael Shanks, actor
 Nell Shipman, actress, film director
 Alexis Smith, actress
 Dallas Smith, musician
 Cobie Smulders, actress (How I Met Your Mother)
 Jewel Staite, actress
 Ryan Stiles, comedian, producer (Whose Line Is It Anyway?)
 Dorothy Stratten, actress, model
 Bobby Taylor, Motown singer (Bobby Taylor and the Vancouvers)
 Jon Mikl Thor, singer, performer and bodybuilder
 Meg Tilly, actress
 Jacob Tremblay, actor
 Daniel Wesley, musician
 Finn Wolfhard, actor, voice actor, musician (Stranger Things, It)
 Glenn Wool, stand-up comedian

Athletes
 Glenn Anderson, ice hockey player
 Peter Bakonyi (1933–1997), Hungarian-born Canadian Olympic fencer
 Jason Bay, baseball player
 Russell Baze
 Jamie Benn
 Jordie Benn
 Mitch Berger
 Rod Brind'Amour
 Hy Buller (1926–1968), All Star NHL ice hockey player
 John Davison
 Ryan Dempster, baseball player
 Brenden Dillon
 Ryan Ellis
 Brandon Clarke, NBA player
 Craig Forrest
 Jeff Francis
 Kaleigh Fratkin (born 1992), professional ice hockey player
 Freddy Fuller
 Danny Gare
Shaul Gordon, Canadian-Israeli Olympic fencer
 Nancy Greene
 Dan Hamhuis
 Rick Hansen
 Rich Harden
 Shawn Horcoff
 Jordyn Huitema
 Daniel Igali
 Barret Jackman
 Harry Jerome
 Teyo Johnson
 Harry Jones
 Paul Kariya
 Larry Kwong
 Andrew Ladd
 Silken Laumann
 Brett Lawrie
 Bob Lenarduzzi
 Adam Loewen
 Mark McMorris
 Willie Mitchell
 Greg Moore
 Justin Morneau, baseball player
 Brendan Morrison
 Steve Nash, basketball player
 Cam Neely
 Rob Niedermayer
 Scott Niedermayer
 Michael Nonni
 Tyler O'Neill
 Pat Onstad
 Simon Pond
 Carey Price
 Mark Recchi
 Gareth Rees
 Morgan Rielly
 Griffin Reinhart
 Max Reinhart
 Sam Reinhart
 Kevin Reynolds, figure skater; 2013 Four Continents champion and 2014 Winter Olympics team silver medalist
 Cliff Ronning
 Joe Sakic
 Eli Schenkel (born 1992), Olympic fencer
 Christine Sinclair
 Paul Spoljaric
 Troy Stecher
 Ari Taub (born 1971), Olympic Greco-Roman wrestler
 John Tenta
 Cliff Thorburn
 Conor Trainor
 John van't Schip
 Larry Walker
 Percy Williams
 Steve Yzerman

Artists
 Hank Bull, painter
 Emily Carr, artist
 Kate Craig, artist
Olea Marion Davis, ceramist, sculptor
 Iris Hauser (born 1956), painter
 Fred Herzog, photographer
 Clive Holden, poet, film director and visual artist
 Karen Jamieson, dancer and choreographer
Beatrice Lennie, painter, sculptor
 Glenn Lewis
 Attila Richard Lukacs, artist
Charles Marega, sculptor
 Len Norris, editorial cartoonist
 Sophie Pemberton, painter
 Bill Reid, artist
 David Rimmer, filmmaker
 Jack Shadbolt, artist
 Godfrey Stephens, artist
 Shane Wilson, artist

Journalists and writers
 Doug Beardsley, poet and educator
 Bill Bissett, poet
 George Bowering, author
 Robert Bringhurst, poet
 Douglas Coupland, author (genX fiction)
 Janice Cowan
 Ranj Dhaliwal, author (crime-fiction)
 Ralph Edwards, naturalist/author (Caruso of Lonesome Lake)
 Timothy Findley, author
 Allan Fotheringham, columnist (politics, often satirical)
 Austin Gary, author
 William Gibson, author (Neuromancer)
 Terry Glavin, columnist/author and naturalist (ecology, fisheries, politics)
 John Stephen Hill, playwright Steve Hill (When I'm 64)
 Bruce Hutchison, editor/columnist and author (The Fraser)
 W.P. Kinsella, author/columnist (Shoeless Joe Goes To Iowa)
 Mark Leiren-Young, author/playwright/screenwriter (Never Shoot a Stampede Queen)
 Malcolm Lowry, novelist (Under the Volcano, October Ferry To Gabriola)
 Eswyn Lyster, genealogist and war bride author (Most Excellent Citizens, Trafford Press 2010)
 Keith Maillard, novelist, poet (Gloria, Motet, Two Strand River)
 Daphne Marlatt, poet
 Alan Morley, journalist and historian (Vancouver: From Milltown to Metropolis)
 Margaret Lally "Ma" Murray, editor, columnist
 Susan Musgrave, poet
 Kliph Nesteroff, writer, broadcaster
 Rohan O'Grady, novelist (Let's Kill Uncle, Pippin's Journal)
 Stan Persky, author and journalist
 Eden Robinson, novelist (Monkey Beach)
 Spider Robinson, author (science fiction)
 George Ryga, playwright (The Ecstasy Of Rita Joe)
 Omar Sachedina, journalist and news anchor (CTV National News)
 Paul St. Pierre (Breaking Smith's Quarter Horse)
 Robin Skelton, poet
 Lauren Southern, right-wing activist and YouTuber
 William Fraser Tolmie, HBC Fur trade employee, medical doctor and later politician
 Margaret Trudeau, author
 Jack Wasserman, columnist (society, show biz, politics)

Others
 Brother Twelve
 Mary John Sr.
 Masajiro Miyazaki, osteopath, coroner and "bush doctor"
 Jim Pattison, businessman and Fortune 500 member
 Caspar Phair, Lillooet, pioneer and first government agent
 Jack Pickup, physician, the "Flying Doctor of British Columbia"
 Arran Stephens, author; founder of Nature's Path
 Amy Soranno, animal rights activist
 Skip Triplett, former president of Kwantlen Polytechnic University
 Jessica Yaniv, transgender activist

References